Yam Haus is an American pop band formed by Lars Pruitt (vocals), Seth Blum (guitar), Jake Felstow (drums), and Zach Beinlich (bass). Their 2018 debut album Stargazer has been streamed over 3.5 million times.

History 
Yam Haus was formed in 2017 in Minneapolis, Minnesota. Lars, Seth, and Zach all met at high school in Hudson, Wisconsin, and later met Jake in Minneapolis while he was attending college. The band had started as a daily YouTube vlog to start building a fanbase. Since their formation, Yam Haus have found themselves selling out shows across the Midwest, and they have been included on lineups such as First Avenue's "Best New Bands" of 2018; and the 2019 Cities 97.1 KTCZ.Basilica Block Party. Yam Haus also sold out their headlining show at First Avenue in December 2019.

Their first single, West Coast, was released April 13, 2018 as a precursor to their debut album, Stargazer. In the winter of 2019 the quartet released their EP called Stargazer Sessions, which features acoustic versions of a number of songs from their debut album and "Spoke Too Soon".

In preparation for their 2020 summer headlining tour the group released their second EP, The Band Is Gonna Make It, featuring their top track, "The Thrill" which was filmed at the popular theme park Valleyfair. The Band Is Gonna Make It Tour has been postponed due to the COVID-19 pandemic. Since the tour postponement, Yam Haus has released two singles, "Pop Game"  and "novocaine". In the winter of 2020 Yam Haus released their first Christmas EP, A Very Yam Haus Christmas, featuring the track "Auld Lang Syne". The song gained recognition as the video featured footage, filmed by Jay Christiansen, from the George Floyd protests in Minneapolis.
Yam Haus was announced as one of the contestants on the American Song Contest, representing Minnesota with the song "Ready to Go".

Band members 

 Lars Pruitt – lead vocals, rhythm guitar, and piano (2017–present)
 Seth Blum – lead guitar and backing vocals (2017–2022)
 Zach Beinlich – bass, lead guitar, and backing vocals (2017–present)
 Jake Felstow – drums and percussion (2017–present)

Discography

Studio albums 

 Stargazer

EPs 

 Stargazer Sessions (2019)
 The Band Is Gonna Make It (2020)
 A Very Yam Haus Christmas (2020)

Singles 

 "West Coast" (2018)
 "Get Somewhere" (2018)
 "Stargazer" (2018)
 "Groovin' (That Feel Good Song)" (2018)
 "Give It Away" (2018)
 "West Coast (Stargazer Sessions)" (2019)
 "Spoke Too Soon (Stargazer Sessions)" (2019)
 "Stargazer (Stargazer Sessions)" (2019)
 "Mama" (2019)
 "The Thrill" (2019)
 "Simplicity" (2019)
 "Wake Up" (2019
 "The Thrill (Acoustic)" (2020)
 "Cute" (2020)
 "wOw!" (2020)
 "Pop Game" (2020)
 "Deck The Halls" (2020)
 "Novocaine" (2021)
 "Whatever It Is" (2021)
 "Ready to Go" (2022)

References

External links 
 https://www.yamhaus.com

Musical groups established in 2017
2017 establishments in Minnesota
American Song Contest contestants